TARGIT A/S is a Danish business intelligence (BI) and analytics software developer based in Aalborg, Denmark, with American subsidiary TARGIT US Inc., based in Tampa, as well as distribution offices in more than 12 countries worldwide.

History 

TARGIT was founded in 1986 by Morten Sandlykke and Søren Leifsgård under the name Sandlykke & Leifsgård. The company initially sold computers and related hardware and provided business operations software to retail and oil businesses.

In 1996, Sandlykke and Leifsgård acquired Morton Systems, led by Morten Middelfart. Following the acquisition, Middelfart became TARGIT's CTO, and the company began developing business intelligence (BI) tools. Middelfart was pivotal in the company's decision to purchase PALM—a BI software product designed in the US that served as the forerunner to the TARGIT Decision Suite solution. 

In 1999, the trio sold the hardware-focused side of the organization and rebranded their remaining business as TARGIT, a BI and analytics company. In the early 2000s, TARGIT expanded from its headquarters in Aalborg, Denmark, opening a second office in Copenhagen and two US offices in Tampa, Florida, and Dublin, Ohio, respectively. The company also has an office in Belgium and external employees in Belarus, Croatia, and Poland.  

In 2017, TARGIT became part of the private equity fund GRO Capital, and Director and Founder Morten Sandlykke stepped down from the executive team. 

Jakob H. Kraglund became TARGIT’s CEO in 2020 and has since focused on developed tailored BI software for several core industries, including heavy equipment, automotive, convenience stores, and the public sector. TARGIT also collaborates with OEMs and consulting partners in these industries to create integrated software solutions for various customers.

Decision Suite 

TARGIT Decision Suite is a BI and analytics platform that helps companies integrate, analyze, and share data from multiple sources via reports and digital dashboards. 

The first version of TARGIT Decision Suite dates back to 1996, when TARGIT acquired Morton Systems. CTO Morten Middelfart developed Decision Suite around the concept of the OODA Decision Loop (Observe, Orient, Decide, and Act) and his own CALM philosophy (Computer Aided Leadership & Management).  

This combination ensured that Decision Suite would allow users to retrieve reports and analyses with as few user interactions as possible. This focus earned Decision Suite a consistent place in Gartner's Magic Quadrant ranking.  

Today, TARGIT Decision Suite combines the control of a centralized BI solution with the flexibility of a decentralized cloud BI solution. TARGIT has earned various recognitions in global market studies, including rankings as a Global Leader in Vendor Credibility by Dresner three years in a row and Leader in BI Excellence by BARC five years in a row.

References 

Business intelligence companies
Companies based in Aalborg
Data visualization software
Business software